Alexander Theodore Callinicos (born 24 July 1950) is a Rhodesian-born British political theorist and activist. An adherent of Trotskyism, he is a member of the Central Committee of the Socialist Workers Party (SWP) and serves as its International Secretary. He is also editor of International Socialism, the SWP's theoretical journal, and has published a number of books.

Biography

Early life
Callinicos's mother, the Honorable Ædgyth Lyon-Dalberg-Acton, was the daughter of the 2nd Lord Acton, descended from the 19th-century English historian Lord Acton. 

Callinicos was educated at St George's College, Salisbury (now Harare).

He became involved in revolutionary politics as a student at Balliol College, Oxford, where he read for his BA and came to know Christopher Hitchens, then himself active in the International Socialists (the SWP's forerunner). He also received his DPhil at Oxford. The earliest writing by Callinicos for the International Socialists was an analysis of the student movement of the period. His other early writings focused on southern Africa and the French structuralist-Marxist philosopher Louis Althusser. In 1977, Callinicos married Joanna Seddon, a fellow Oxford doctoral student.

Career and activism
Callinicos participated in the Counter-Summit to the IMF/World Bank Meeting in Prague, September 2000 and the demonstration against the G8 in Genoa, June 2001. He has also been involved in organising the Social Forum movement in Europe. He was a contributor to Dictionnaire Marx Contemporain (2001), and has written articles in New Left Review.

He was Professor of Politics at the University of York before being appointed Professor of European Studies at King's College London in September 2005. He succeeded Chris Harman as editor of International Socialism in January 2010 shortly after Harman died and is a British correspondent for Actuel Marx. Callinicos joined the central committee of the SWP in the late 1970s; he retains this position.

In January 2013, in the context of a serious crisis inside the UK Socialist Workers Party (SWP) associated with the party's response to an allegation of rape against a leading member of the party, known as Comrade Delta, and with the demand for changes to the existing form of the system of democratic centralism within the SWP, he wrote a defence of Leninism and democratic centralism. Callinicos disagreed with those who argued for the need to change the existing system. He called the allegation of rape a "difficult disciplinary case", a comment for which socialist feminist Laurie Penny thought he "[mistook] a plea for some basic respect for women's sexual autonomy as an attempt to undermine the revolution from within."

Callinicos also took a prominent position on another issue which had divided the Socialist Workers Party (SWP): the use of the Internet in disagreements about confidential party issues. He complained about "the dark side of the Internet" in which individuals have "used blogs and social media to launch a campaign within the SWP".

In order to disentangle a conference organised by the Historical Materialism journal in Delhi during 2013 from the SWP crisis, his invitation to the conference was withdrawn in March 2013.

Works

Books / pamphlets 
1976: Althusser's Marxism (London: Pluto Press) 
1977: Southern Africa after Soweto (with John Rogers) (London: Pluto Press), 
1981: Southern Africa after Zimbabwe (London: Pluto) 
1982: Is there a future for Marxism? (London: Macmillan). 
1983: Marxism and Philosophy (Oxford: Clarendon). 
1983: The revolutionary ideas of Karl Marx (London: Bookmarks). 
1983: The Revolutionary Road to Socialism (London: Socialist Workers Party). 
1985: South Africa: the Road to Revolution (Toronto: International Socialists). 
1985: The Great Strike : the miners’ strike of 1984-5 and its lessons (with Mike Simons) (London: Socialist Worker) 
1987: The Changing Working Class: Essays on Class Structure Today (with Chris Harman) (London: Bookmarks) 
1988: South Africa Between Reform and Revolution (London: Bookmarks). 
1988: Making History: Agency, Structure, and Change in Social Theory (Ithaca, N.Y.: Cornell University Press). 
1989: Marxist Theory (editor) (Oxford: Oxford University Press). 
1990: Trotskyism (Minneapolis: University of Minnesota Press). 
1991: The Revenge of History: Marxism and the East European Revolutions 
1991: Against Postmodernism: a Marxist critique (Cambridge: Polity Press). 
1992: Between Apartheid and Capitalism: conversations with South African socialists (editor) (London: Bookmarks). 
1994: Marxism and the New Imperialism (London ; Chicago, Ill. : Bookmarks). 
1995: Theories and Narratives (Cambridge: Polity Press). 
1995: Race and Class (London: Bookmark Publications). 
1995: Socialists in the trade unions (London: Bookmarks) 
1996: New Labour or socialism? (London: Bookmarks) 
1999: Social Theory: Historical Introduction (New York: New York University Press). 
2000: Equality (Themes for the 21st Century) (Cambridge: Polity Press). 
2002: Against the Third Way (Cambridge: Polity Press). 
2003: An anti-Capitalist manifesto (Cambridge: Polity Press). 
2003: New Mandarins of American Power: the Bush administration’s plans for the world (Cambridge: Polity Press). 
 2006: Universities in a Neoliberal World (London: Bookmarks) 
2006: The Resources of Critique (Cambridge: Polity). 
2009: Imperialism and Global Political Economy (Cambridge, Polity). 
2010: Bonfire of Illusions: The Twin Crises of the Liberal World (Polity). 
2012: The Revolutionary Ideas of Karl Marx (Haymarket) 
2014: Deciphering Capital: Marx's Capital and its destiny (London: Bookmarks).

Articles 

"Trotsky’s Theory of Permanent Revolution" (1982)
"The 'New Middle Class' and socialists" (1983)
"Bourgeois Revolutions and Historical Materialism" (1989)
"Marxism and Imperialism Today" (1991)
"Race and Class" (1992)
"Wonders Taken for Signs: Homi Bhabha's Postcolonialism". In Post-Ality: Marxism and Postmodernism. Edited by Mas'ud Zavarzadeh, Teresa Ebert, and Donald Morton. Washington, DC: Maisonneuve Press (1995). 
"The Anti-Capitalist Movement And The Revolutionary Left" (2001)
"Plumbing the depths: Marxism and the Holocaust" (2001)
"The grand strategy of the American Empire" (2002)
"Imperialism and Global Political Economy", International Socialism, 108, Autumn 2005.
"Interview with Alex Callinicos: The Imperial Assault on the Middle East" (2006)
"Does capitalism need the state system?", Cambridge Review of International Affairs, 20(4), (2007) pp. 533–549.
"Where is the radical left going?", International Socialism, 120, Autumn 2008.
"The Limits of Passive Revolution" Capital & Class, vol 34, no. 3, pp. 491–507. (2010).
"The internationalist case against the European Union", International Socialism, 148 (2015).
Brexit: a world-historic turn, International Socialism, 151 (2016). 
The orphaned revolution: The meaning of October 1917, International Socialism, 156 (2017).
Chris Harman and the critique of political economy, International Socialism, 165 (2020).

References

External links
Alex Callinicos Internet Archive
 Callinicos lecture on "Imperialism and the Global Political Economy," UK: 2009. 

1950 births
Living people
Academics of King's College London
Academics of the University of York
Alumni of St. George's College, Harare
Alumni of Balliol College, Oxford
British Marxists
British philosophers
British political writers
British Trotskyists
Critics of postmodernism
Marxist theorists
Marxist writers
People from Harare
Rhodesian communists
Socialist Workers Party (UK) members
White Rhodesian people
Rhodesian people of Greek descent
Alex